7α-Methyl-19-norandrostenedione (MENT dione), or 7α-methyl-19-norandrost-4-ene-3,17-dione, also known as trestione, as well as 7α-methylestr-4-ene-3,17-dione, is a synthetic anabolic-androgenic steroid (AAS) and a derivative of 19-nortestosterone (nandrolone). It may act as a prohormone of trestolone (7α-methyl-19-nortestosterone; MENT). MENT dione has been sold on the Internet under the name Mentabolan as a "dietary supplement".

See also
 4-Androstenedione
 Bolandiol
 Bolandione
 Bolenol
 Dienedione
 Methoxydienone

References

Androgens and anabolic steroids
Diketones
Estranes
Prodrugs